The 2008 Women's National Invitation Tournament (WNIT) was a single-elimination tournament of 48 National Collegiate Athletic Association (NCAA) Division I teams that did not participate in the 2008 NCAA Division I women's basketball tournament. The 40th annual tournament was played from March 19, 2008, to April 5, 2008, entirely on campus sites. The highest ranked team in each conference that did not receive a bid to the NCAA Tournament received an automatic bid to this tournament. The remaining slots were filled by the WNIT Selection Committee.  Marquette defeated Michigan State, 81–66, to win the tournament.

Seeding
Teams are not seeded in the WNIT. Rather, teams are placed into one of three tiers. Teams in the upper tier are spread around the bracket as best as possible, although not every upper tier team receives a first round bye. Lower tier and middle tier teams tend to meet in the first round, while upper tier teams will usually play winners of first-round games in the second round. The organizers attempt to bracket the first two rounds based on geography. The location of games is determined in part by seed, but also by facility availability and other factors.

Bracket

Section 1

Note: Asterisk denotes home team. † denotes overtime.

Section 2

Note: Asterisk denotes home team. † denotes overtime.

Section 3

Note: Asterisk denotes home team. † denotes overtime.

Section 4

Note: Asterisk denotes home team

Semifinals and finals

Note: Asterisk denotes home team

All-tournament team
 Krystal Ellis, Marquette (MVP)
 Angel Robinson, Marquette
 Allyssa DeHaan, Michigan State
 Kalisha Keane, Michigan State
 Khadijah Washington, NC State
 Jackie McFarland, Colorado
Source:

See also
 2008 NCAA Division I women's basketball tournament

 2008 National Invitation Tournament

References

Women's National Invitation Tournament
Women's National Invitation Tournament
Women's National Invitation Tournament
Women's National Invitation Tournament
Women's National Invitation Tournament